Cionus is a genus of weevils.

Species  

 Cionus alauda 
 Cionus albidus 
 Cionus albopubens 
 Cionus albopunctatus 
 Cionus albosparsus 
 Cionus alluaudi 
 Cionus amictus 
 Cionus angulicollis 
 Cionus antirrhini 
 Cionus asellus 
 Cionus atlanticus 
 Cionus auriculus 
 Cionus batianii 
 Cionus beccabungae 
 Cionus bipunctatus 
 Cionus bipustulatus 
 Cionus blattariae 
 Cionus bulgaricus 
 Cionus campanulae 
 Cionus canariensis 
 Cionus capensis 
 Cionus caprimulgus 
 Cionus catenatus 
 Cionus caucasicus 
 Cionus championi 
 Cionus clairvillei 
 Cionus compactus  
 Cionus congoanus 
 Cionus coriaceus  
 Cionus costipennis  
 Cionus decorus  
 Cionus densenotatus  
 Cionus dependens  
 Cionus distinctus  
 Cionus donckieri  
 Cionus elegantulus 
 Cionus ferrugans 
 Cionus ferrugatus 
 Cionus flavocalcaratus 
 Cionus flavoguttatus 
 Cionus flavopunctatus 
 Cionus fraxini 
 Cionus galanus 
 Cionus galloisi 
 Cionus ganglbaueri 
 Cionus gebleri 
 Cionus gibbifrons 
 Cionus globulariae 
 Cionus globulus 
 Cionus goricus 
 Cionus graminis 
 Cionus griseopubens 
 Cionus griseus 
 Cionus hauseri 
 Cionus helleri 
 Cionus hemisphaericus 
 Cionus histrio 
 Cionus hortulanus 
 Cionus hypsibatus 
 Cionus impunctatus 
 Cionus indicus 
 Cionus ingratus 
 Cionus interruptus 
 Cionus japonicus 
 Cionus kunzii 
 Cionus labilis  
 Cionus leonhardi  
 Cionus leucostictus  
 Cionus linariae  
 Cionus longicollis  
 Cionus luctuosus 
 Cionus lythri 
 Cionus melanarius  
 Cionus meleagris  
 Cionus merkli  
 Cionus meticulatus  
 Cionus meticulosus  
 Cionus micros  
 Cionus moestus  
 Cionus montanus  
 Cionus netus 
 Cionus nigritarsis 
 Cionus nigropunctatus 
 Cionus noctis 
 Cionus notatus 
 Cionus nubilosus 
 Cionus obesus 
 Cionus obscurus 
 Cionus ocellatus 
 Cionus ochraceus 
 Cionus ogasawarai 
 Cionus olens 
 Cionus olivieri 
 Cionus orientalis 
 Cionus osyridis 
 Cionus pallidulus 
 Cionus pallidus 
 Cionus parcenotatus 
 Cionus pardus 
 Cionus pascuorum 
 Cionus perlatus 
 Cionus pici 
 Cionus pictus 
 Cionus plantarum 
 Cionus ponticus 
 Cionus pulchellus 
 Cionus pulvereus  
 Cionus pulverosus 
 Cionus pustulatus 
 Cionus rostellum  
 Cionus salicariae  
 Cionus schoenherri 
 Cionus schrophulariae 
 Cionus schultzei  
 Cionus scrophulariae 
 Cionus semialbellus 
 Cionus setiger 
 Cionus similis 
 Cionus simplex 
 Cionus solani 
 Cionus solanus 
 Cionus spilotus 
 Cionus spinosulus 
 Cionus stimulosus 
 Cionus subalpinus 
 Cionus subsquamosus 
 Cionus suturalis 
 Cionus tamazo 
 Cionus tarsalis  
 Cionus telonensis 
 Cionus teter 
 Cionus thapsi 
 Cionus thapsicola 
 Cionus thapsus 
 Cionus thaspi 
 Cionus thoracicus  
 Cionus tieffenbachi 
 Cionus tissoni  
 Cionus tonkinensis 
 Cionus transquamosus 
 Cionus trionatus 
 Cionus tristis 
 Cionus tuberculosus 
 Cionus tuberosus 
 Cionus ulmi  
 Cionus ungulatus  
 Cionus uniformis  
 Cionus usambicus  
 Cionus variegatus  
 Cionus verbasci 
 Cionus veronicae  
 Cionus vestitus  
 Cionus villae  
 Cionus virgatus 
 Cionus wanati 
 Cionus wittei 
 Cionus woodi

References 

 Clairville, J.P. de 1798: Entomologie helvétique ou catalogue des Insectes de la Suisse rangés d'après une nouvelle méthode./ Helvetische Entomologie oder Verzeichniss der Schweizer Insecten, nach einer neuen Methode geordnet mit Beschreibungen und Abbildungen. Vol.: 1. Orell, Füssli & Co.. Zürich: 149 pp. + 16 pl..

Curculionidae genera
Curculioninae